Proteus is a film by Canadian director John Greyson. The film, based on an early 18th century court record from Cape Town, explores the romantic relationship between two prisoners, one black and one white, at Robben Island in South Africa in the 18th century.

Although the film premiered at the 2003 Toronto International Film Festival, it did not have a general theatrical release until 2005.

Plot
Set in 18th-century South Africa, the film dramatizes the true story of Claas Blank (Rouxnet Brown) and Rijkhaart Jacobsz (Neil Sandilands), two prisoners on Robben Island. Herder Claas Blank was serving 10 years for "insulting a Dutch citizen" and Rijkhaart was a Dutch sailor convicted of committing "unnatural acts" with another man. The two men, initially hostile to each other, form a secret relationship, using trips to a private water tank to bond. Their relationship had a racial component, as Jacobsz was a Dutchman, while Blank was a Khoi.

Virgil Niven (Shawn Smyth), a Scottish botanist, befriends Blank for his knowledge of South African flora, including the protea. It is suggested that he may have had a sexual interest in Blank.

In 1735, Blank and Jacobsz were executed for sodomy by drowning, after jealousy by other inmates caused problems.

The film ends with an extract from the speech Nelson Mandela made at his sentencing hearing in 1964, before he was imprisoned on Robben Island.

Analysis 
The film explores unanswered questions, such as why prison officials tolerated the relationship for a full decade before Blank and Jacobsz were executed. In an interview packaged with the DVD release, John Greyson notes the real Blank and Jacobsz began their relationship when they were both teenagers—Blank having been imprisoned on Robben Island at age 16—and were actually known to be a couple for twenty years before they were charged with sodomy and executed, when they were both nearly 40.

Intentional anachronisms, such as transistor radios, electric typewriters and jeeps, are used in the film to illustrate Greyson's larger theme that homophobia and racism of the type that led to Blank's and Jacobsz' executions remain very much present in the world. These twentieth-century objects, including contemporary (c. 1964) dress on many occasions, appear in juxtaposition with eighteenth-century items. The eighteenth-century prison commandant, for example, is replaced by a former subordinate who wears a twentieth-century guard's uniform and is often accompanied by a fierce-looking Alsatian on a short lead. A wet bag, a torture devise from Apartheid South Africa, is seen.

Cast 
 Rouxnet Brown as Claas Blank
 Shaun Smyth as Virgil Niven
 Neil Sandilands as Rijkhaart Jacobz
 Kristen Thomson as Kate
 Tessa Jubber as Elize
 Terry Norton as Betsy
 Adrienne Pearce as Tinnie
 Grant Swanby as Willer
 Brett Goldin as Lourens
 A.J. van der Merwe as Settler
 Deon Lotz as Governor
 Jeroen Kranenburg as Scholz
 Andre Samuels as !Nanseb
 Johan Jacobs as Nama Prisoner
 Katrina Kaffer as Kaness
 Kwanda Malunga as Claas (when age 10)
 Illias Moseko as Claas's Grandfather
 Andre Lindveldt as Minstrel
 Peter van Heerden as Soldier
 Jane Rademeyer as Niven's Wife
 Andre Odendaal as Floris
 Lola Dollimore as Niven's Daughter
 Robin Smith as Munster
 Colin le Roux as Hendrik
 Andre Rousseau as De Mepesche
 Edwin Angless as Hangman

Reception
Dennis Harvey of Variety stated that the "film has enough erotic and exotic content to win arthouse viewers" but it "lacks lush aesthetics and impassioned complexity, ending up a tad remote".

Giving the film 3 out of 4 stars, Ken Fox of TV Guide said "the postmodern touches never detract from what is at heart a deeply moving love story".

Dave Kehr of The New York Times stated "a heavy, pretentious, and derivative film" and it had been "gussied it up with fantasy sequences and formal games that distract from the dramatic core".

References

External links 
 

2003 films
Films set in South Africa
2000s English-language films
English-language South African films
English-language Canadian films
Afrikaans-language films
2000s Dutch-language films
Canadian drama films
LGBT-related films based on actual events
Films directed by John Greyson
Canadian LGBT-related films
South African LGBT-related films
LGBT-related drama films
2003 LGBT-related films
South African drama films
2003 multilingual films
Canadian multilingual films
South African multilingual films
2000s Canadian films